Giannutri Lighthouse is an active lighthouse, located at Punta Rossa, the southernmost part of the island and of the Tuscan Archipelago on the Tyrrhenian Sea.

Description

The lighthouse is completely automated, powered by a solar unit, and managed by the Marina Militare with the identification code number 2184 E.F.

See also
 List of lighthouses in Italy

References

External links

 Servizio Fari Marina Militare

Lighthouses in Tuscany
Isola del Giglio
Lighthouses in Italy